Charles Mills Sheldon (24 June 186614 March 1928) was a war correspondent, artist, and book illustrator, born in the United States, who moved to Europe in 1890.

Early life
Sheldon was born in Lawrenceburg, Indiana on 24 June 1866 to George Wilbur Sheldon (11 November 18433 January 1922) and Jeanette Mills (c. 18472 February 1929). He was educated at public schools in Lawrenceburg and Des Moines The 1880 census found him living at home with his parents at age 14, in Des Moines, Iowa. While Hogson states that his father was a publisher, the census return for both 1880 and 1910 gives his father's trade as a Tinner, in a Tin shop.

Work

After initially travelling the Southern United States to illustrated articles for the Associated Press in 1889, Sheldon had move to Paris where he studied at the Académie Julian under Jean-Joseph Benjamin-Constant and Jules Joseph Lefebvre. From Paris he provided illustrations of happenings there for the Pall Mall Budget. Among the different magazines he illustrated for were:
Pall Mall Budget
The Ludgate Monthly (which was renamed a number of times)
The Strand Magazine
Black and White
Frank Leslie's Illustrated Newspaper
The Royal Magazine

Work as war correspondent
He was a war correspondent for Black and White, and later for Leslie's for a number of conflicts including:
The Jameson Raid (18951896), for which he famously packed and left within 17 minutes of getting notice. The Raid was long over even before Sheldon set out, and his dispatches home included things like a large picture of a gold mine in the Transvaal.
Kitchener's campaign in the Anglo-Egyptian conquest of Sudan in 1886. This time he got 3 hours notice to pack as a cablegram had got lost in the Post Office in Johannesburg for seven days. This campaign was also notable for the libel case between two war correspondents Knight and Attridge. In a letter home, Knight had accused Attridge of cowardice, and of abandoning the man he was sharing a hut with to death by cholera. Attridge sued and won damages of £1,000, an enormous sum at the time. Sheldon gave evidence at the trial. 
In Cuba for the Spanish–American War in 1898.
In South Africa for the Second Boer War from 1899 on
In India for the 1903 Delhi Durbar. His son Eugene later presented 156 photographs that Sheldon had taken at the time to the India Office Library.

Samples of illustrations from the Sudan campaign
The following illustrations were drawn by Sheldon as War Correspondent for Black and White for Kitchener's campaign for the Anglo-Egyptian conquest of Sudan. The days of the illustrator war correspondent were already numbered. Hodson notes that photography was becoming the dominant art and that this, and the redrawing of war correspondent's sketches to be more dramatic and photography-like was already leading to a falling-off in the quality of illustrations. Black and White was already redrawing some of Sheldon's sketches in this way. By the time of the campaign in Cuba, Sheldon was providing photographs for publication as well as sketches.

Work as a book illustrator
Most of the books he illustrated were boys' adventure books and this illustrations frequently show fighting and conflict. Among the books he illustrated were:.
 1886: True to the Old Flag: A  Tale of the American War of Independence by G. A. Henty
 1899: Won by the Sword: A  Tale of the Thirty Years' War by G.A. Henty
 1899: The Four Miss Whittingtons by Geralding Mockler
 1900: In the Irish Brigade: A  Tale of War in Flanders and Spain by G.A. Henty
 1900: Under the Rebel's Reign: A  Story of Egyptian Revolt by Charles Neufeld
 1901: The Goddess of Excelsior by Bret Harte
 1902: To Herat and Cabul, A Story of the First Afghan War by  G.A. Henty
 1903: In the grip of the mullah : A  tale of adventure in Somaliland by Frederick Sadleir Brereton
 1904: Tom Burnaby: A  story of Uganda and the great Congo forest by Herbert Strang
 1905: The Queen of Shindy Flat by Bessie Marchant
 1906: !Tention: A  Story of Boy-Life during the Peninsular War by George Manville Fenn
 1907: On the Trail of the Arabs: A  Story of Heroic Deeds in Africa by Herbert Strang
 1908: The island traders: A  tale of the South Seas by Alexander Macdonald
 1910: John Bargreave's Gold. A tale of adventures in the Caribbean by F.S. Brereton
 1911: The Invisible Island - A Story of the Far North of Queensland by Alexander MacDonald
 1912: Under the Chinese dragon: A  tale of Mongolia. by F.S. Brereton
 1912: Captured at Tripoli: A  tale of adventure by Percy F. Westerman
 1912: The Nameless Prince: A tale of Plantagenet days by Grace I. Whitham 
 1914: Pioneers in Tropical America by Harry Johnston
 1914: Edgar the Ready: A  Tale of the Third Edward's Reign by W. P. Shervill
 1914: The King's Knight. A tale of the days of King Edward III by Grace I. Whitham 
 1915: A sturdy young Canadian by Frederick Sadleir Brereton
 1915: Chaloner of the Bengal Cavalry: A  Tale of the Indian Mutiny by Percival Lancaster

Sample of book illustration
The following illustrations were drawn by Sheldon for Under the Chinese dragon: A tale of Mongolia. (by F.S. Brereton).

Marriage and Family
Sheldon married Grace Mary Garland (20 February 186824 Dec 1935), a childhood friend, at St George Hanover Square on 26 November 1896. He had just returned from the Sudan where he had been a war correspondent. Grace was the daughter of Eugene Fitch (15 August 184617 February 1918) an inventor, who invented, among other things an early mechanical digital clock. and Fannie Garland (22 Nov 194816 August 1902).

The couple had at least two children:
Grace Jeanette Sheldon (1 October 1899 last quarter of 1915).
Eugene Fitch Mills Sheldon (22 February 19056 August 1991) who married Jean Raymond (1914) in Paris on 27 July 1934. The couple had a son, born in Zug, Switzerland on 11 April 1936. His mother died at his home in Zug in December 1935. She was probably living with him there as her most recent passport had been issued in Zurich on 17 May 1934.

The 1901 census found Sheldon with his wife and daughter at 3 Bath Road in Chiswick, London, which was still his address on the electoral register some 12 years later.

Death

Sheldon dies on 14 March at Chiswick Hospital in Chiswick, London. He was living at 45a Fairfax Road, Bedford Park, Chiswick, London at the time. His effects were valued at £1,417 12s 5d. His widow was still living at this address in 1930.

Notes

References

External links
Note searches for the work of Charles M. Sheldon generally return the work of the Reverend Charles Monroe Sheldon rather than that of Charles Mills Sheldon.
 
 Charles Mills Sheldon at Online Books Page
 Books illustrated by Sheldon at the Internet Archive. This list is not complete as Sheldon often used a middle initial rather than his full middle name.
 Books illustrated by Sheldon in the Jisc Library Hub Discover.
 Books with illustrations by Sheldon in the Jisc Library Hub Discover. There is some overlap between the two searches but searching in this way avoids filling the list with books by Charles Monroe Sheldon.

1866 births
1928 deaths
Académie Julian alumni
American male artists
People from Lawrenceburg, Indiana
American war artists
War correspondents
British illustrators
British children's book illustrators
Magazine illustrators
People from Des Moines, Iowa
Artists from Iowa
Associated Press people